Shank is a 2009 British drama film starring Wayne Virgo, Marc Laurent, Alice Payne, Tom Bott and Garry Summers. The film was written by Darren Flaxstone and Christian Martin, directed by Simon Pearce & Christian Martin (uncredited), and produced by independent filmmaker Robert Shulevitz and Christian Martin.
 
The film won an Audience award in the 2009 Barcelona International Gay & Lesbian Film Festival as well as the Emerging Talent in Queer Cinema in 2009 at the Miami Gay and Lesbian Film Festival.

Plot
In Bristol, Cal (Wayne Virgo) is a 19-year-old closeted gay gang member who has nothing in his life except drugs, sex, random acts of violence and a secret that he keeps hidden from his mates. An online hookup for sex with a stranger, Scott (Garry Summers), ends in him assaulting and abandoning Scott out in the countryside. This temporarily satisfies but fails to dampen his unspoken desires for his best mate, Jonno (Tom Bott). Nessa (Alice Payne), their twisted, foul-mouthed and controlling, de facto gang leader who harbours much hatred towards everyone for losing a child at the age of 14, suspects that there is something going on between them but is unable to confirm it. Jonno, putty in Nessa's hands, cannot express his own deep rooted and unrequited attachment to Cal. Manipulating situations that bring her closer to having her suspicions confirmed, Nessa sets out about dividing loyalties and encouraging conflict.

An innocent student, Olivier (Marc Laurent), falls victim to one of Nessa’s plans and is mugged on her orders by the gang. Cal steps in to restrain them and creates a distraction allowing Olivier to run free. Ignoring Nessa's screams of contempt, he chases after him and offers him a lift by way of an apology. Fearing that the fall-out from Nessa for his actions will be harsh, Cal persuades Olivier to help him out. Seizing the moral high ground and sensing that there was something more to Cal's Good Samaritan act, Olivier allows Cal to stay with him for a few days. Acting on his own attraction to Cal, Olivier seduces him and in doing so, exposes Cal to new emotions and a tenderness that he has never experienced before.

Soon, the boys are overtaken by the embrace of the first flush of love. Cal and Olivier's relationship progress, but Olivier is warned by Scott, who happens to be one of his professors, to be wary of Cal. Scott gives Olivier his phone number and tells Olivier to contact him if he is ever in need of help. Nessa cannot contain her rage for Cal's disloyalty to the gang and sets about hunting him down, intent on destroying him once and for all. With her gang in tow and Jonno tightly wound up, she kidnaps Olivier, taunting Cal with video messages via her mobile phone, to come and save his boyfriend. Arriving at the abandoned factory where they are all waiting for him, he reveals that he is equally hurt by the child she lost, as he was the father. Meanwhile, Jonno and the other gang members begin to destroy Cal's car before they turn toward him. As the showdown unfolds, Nessa loses all control of events and Jonno explodes in act of sexual aggression by raping Cal and leaving everyone traumatized. Shocked by what she has witnessed, Nessa realizes she will now never be able to break the bond between Cal and Olivier while she and the other gang members flee. Olivier then contacts Scott for help and he rescues them and tends to Cal's wounds.

As the film ends Cal sends Scott a video of the man being beat up in the opening scenes of the movie, with the message "Sorry". That man turns out to be Scott's husband (they both wore wedding rings) who is still in a coma at the hospital. Cal throws away his phone, before joining hands and boarding a train with Olivier, severing his last remaining link to the gang and his old life.

Cast
 Wayne Virgo as Cal
 Marc Laurent as Olivier
 Alice Payne as Nessa
 Tom Bott as Jonno
 Garry Summers as Scott
 Bernie Hodges as Will
 Christian Martin as David
 Louise Fearnside as Dayna
 Lewis Alexander as Souljah
 Oliver Park as Gang Member 1

Release
Shank was released on 14 April 2009 in the United Kingdom. It was released in the United States in May 2009 at the Miami Gay and Lesbian Film Festival. The DVD release was on 8 December 2009.

Critical reception
, the film holds a 60% approval rating on review aggregator website Rotten Tomatoes, based on five reviews with an average rating of 5.9 out of 10.

Sequel
The film was followed by a sequel, Cal, in 2013.

Awards
 Barcelona International Gay & Lesbian Film Festival -Won, Audience Awards 2009
 Miami Gay and Lesbian Film Festival- Won, Emerging Talent in Queer Cinema (Simon Pearce) 2009

See also
 List of lesbian, gay, bisexual, or transgender-related films by storyline

References

External links
 
 
 
 
  

2009 films
2009 drama films
Black British cinema
Black British mass media
Black British films
British drama films
British LGBT-related films
Films set in Bristol
2000s French-language films
2009 LGBT-related films
2000s English-language films
2000s British films